Ha Mei San Tsuen is a village in Wang Chau, Yuen Long District, Hong Kong.

Administration
Ha Mei San Tsuen is a recognized village under the New Territories Small House Policy. It is one of the 37 villages represented within the Ping Shan Rural Committee. For electoral purposes, Ha Mei San Tsuen is part of the Ping Shan Central constituency.

References

External links

 Delineation of area of existing village Ha Mei San Tsuen (Ping Shan) for election of resident representative (2019 to 2022)

Villages in Yuen Long District, Hong Kong
Wang Chau (Yuen Long)